Ranjana Kumar (born 10 December 1945) is an Indian banker who served as Vigilance Commissioner in Central Vigilance Commission and Chairperson of National Bank for Agriculture and Rural Development (NABARD). She had begun her banking career in 1966 as a probationary officer in Bank of India where she served in various positions. When the Government of India appointed her as the Chairperson and managing Director of the Indian Bank, she became the first woman to become head of a public sector bank in India.

Bibliography
 A New Beginning: The Turnaround Story of Indian Bank - 2009.

Awards
 Professional Manager of the Year - 2014

References

External links
Ranjana Kumar

Living people
Businesspeople from Hyderabad, India
Indian women bankers
Indian bankers
Businesswomen from Andhra Pradesh
1945 births